Loch an Iúir, anglicised as Loughanure, is a village and townland in the north-west of County Donegal, Ireland. It is halfway between Gweedore and Dungloe, on the N56 road, in the Gaeltacht area of the Rosses. According to the 2016 census, 37% of the population spoke Irish on a daily basis outside the education system.

Notable people
 Niall Ó Dónaill, (1908–1995)  Irish-language lexicographer. His Dictionary 'Foclóir Gaeilge/Béarla' (1977) is consulted by language students worldwide as the bible of the native tongue. Other books by the same writer: 'Bruighean Feille' and 'Na Glúnta Rosannacha' (1952) a history of the Rosses from the Dark Ages. Ó Dónaill was born in 'Barr na hAilte' Loch an Iúir in 1908 and died in 1995. He is revered with pride in his native Donegal.

See also
 List of populated places in Ireland

References

External links
 Village website

Gaeltacht towns and villages
The Rosses
Towns and villages in County Donegal
Loughanure